Mike Mavor is a New Zealand rugby union player. He was the first North Otago player to play 100 games. After retirement he was pulled back to the North Otago squad due to injuries to the team.

References

Year of birth missing (living people)
Living people
New Zealand rugby union players
North Otago rugby union players